Roma Manek is a Gujarati actress. She has worked in many Gujarati films as lead actress and as Madri (Pandu's second wife) in the television serial Mahabharat.

Selected filmography

Hindi movies

Peecha Karo (1988)

Chambal ka Badshah*, leading role(heroine) with Danny.(ref. Youtube, full movie video of this film)

Dil Hai Ke Manta Nahin (1991) ... Fisherwomen in Song "Galayat Sakli Sonyachi" (Special Appearance)
Zindagi Ek Juaa (1992) .... Dancer in Shakti Dancing Group (Special Appearance)
Junoon (1992) .... Dance partner in Song "O Mere Dilruba" (Special Appearance)
Zamane Se Kya Darna (1994) .... Gauri, Tribal Woman
 Henna (1990) ... Der na ho jaaye song.

Gujrati movies
Desh Re Joya Dada Pardesh Joya 
Karvani Jod
Unchi Medina Uncha Mol
Man Say bani Mediye
Daldu lagyu, Sayba na desh ma
Kanto Bagyo Kale
Sathiya Puravo Ho Raj
Aatmane Vage Ruda Dhol
Aanganiya Sajavo Raj
Moti na chowk re Sapna ma ditha
Pardesi Maniyaro
Sheni Vijanand 
Raj-Ratan 
Chundi Odhado Ho Raj
Baba Ramdev

Television series
Mahabharat 1988 as Madri 
Jai Hanuman 1997 as Kaushalya

References

Year of birth missing (living people)
Living people
Indian film actresses